Julio Diego Ibarra Maldonado (born July 15, 1966) is a Chilean politician. Ibarra was the Governor of Cardenal Caro Province since he was appointed by President of Chile Sebastián Piñera on March 16, 2010. He left office on March 12, 2014.

Between 2000 and 2004, Ibarra had also worked as Councillor of the commune of Pedro Aguirre Cerda in the Santiago Metropolitan Region.

Early life
Julio Ibarra was born on July 15, 1966. He is a native of Las Cabras, Cachapoal Province, and studied Public Administration, specializing in Finance, in the Instituto Iplacex. Ibarra also studied at the Escuela de Carabineros de Chile between 1987 and 1988 in order to become a police officer.

From 1990 to 2002, Ibarra was a publicity and textile businessman. Between 2003 and 2010, he worked as co-administrator and backer of the Escuela Particular Diego Thompson in San Ramón, Santiago Metropolitan Region.

Political career

Ibarra was elected Councillor of Pedro Aguirre Cerda, a commune in the Santiago Metropolitan Region, in 2000 with 5631 (9,46%) from the 59526 total votes, and held the charge until 2004.

On March 16, 2010, Julio Ibarra was appointed Governor of Cardenal Caro Province by President Sebastián Piñera. Ibarra had worked with Piñera during his 2010 presidential campaign as head of campaign operations in the Santiago Metropolitan Region.

Ibarra first appeared in public in this role on March 17, along with Intendant of O'Higgins Region Rodrigo Pérez Mackenna, and Eduardo Cornejo Lagos and Marie Jeanne Lyon Amand de Mendieta, the recently appointed Governors of Colchagua and Cachapoal Provinces respectively.

Julio Ibarra assumed his position as governor of Cardenal Caro just after a devastating earthquake on February 27 that devastated central Chile, including the province, and another earthquake on March 11, centered in province capital Pichilemu.

Personal life
Ibarra is married to Carla García. They have one child, named Diego Ignacio Ibarra García (born February 6, 1996).

References

External links

 Facebook profile of Julio Ibarra

1966 births
Living people
People from Cachapoal Province
Chilean people of Basque descent
National Renewal (Chile) politicians
Governors of provinces of Chile
Cardenal Caro Province